The Free or high Lordship (Fief) of Purmerend and Purmerland and after 1618 Purmerland and Ilpendam (Dutch: "vrije of hoge heerlijkheid") was a type of local jurisdiction with many rights.

History

Purmerend and Purmerland 
As a free or high Lordship Purmerend - Purmerland - Ilpendam itself was an Allod in the province Holland. In 1410 the Lordship "Purmerend and Purmerland" was founded for Willem Eggert, the advisor of William II, Duke of Bavaria, count of Holland. In 1572 the Lordship was taken by the States of Holland.

Purmerland and Ilpendam 
In 1618 the new Lordship was re-established under the name "Purmerland and Ilpendam". Since 1678 the heerlijkheid was a possession of the prominent family De Graeff from Amsterdam. When the French introduced the municipal system in the Netherlands, the rights of the heerlijkheid were largely abolished, although the heerlijkheid itself existed until the early 20th century.

[[Image:The Nightwatch by Rembrandt - Rijksmuseum.jpg|right|thumb|200px|Frans Banning Cocq (with a red sash) in Rembrandt's Night Watch]]

Lords

 Purmerend and Purmerland 
Eggert
 (1410–1417) Willem Eggert
 (1417-14??) Jan Eggert
 (14??-14??) Jan, Bastard of Bavaria
 (14??-1430) Willem Eggert II
 (1430–1440) Gerrit van Zijl

Montfoort
 (1440–1449) Johan van Montfoort
 (1449-14??) Hendrik van Montfoort
 (14??-1483) Jan van Montfoort. Confiscated after the Second Utrecht Civil War

Egmont
 (1483-1516) John III van Egmont
 (1516-1528) John IV van Egmont
 (1528–1541) Charles I van Egmont
 (1541–1568) Lamoraal van Egmont
 (1568–1582) Philip van Egmont

States of Holland
 (1582–1618) States of Holland

 Purmerland and Ilpendam 
Overlander, Hooft, Banning Cocq
 (1618–1630) Volkert Overlander
 (1630–1636) Geertruid Hooft
 (1636–1655) Frans Banning Cocq
 (1655–1678) Maria Overlander van Purmerland

De Graeff
 (1678–1691) Catharina Hooft
 (1678–1690) Jacob de Graeff
 (1690–1707) Pieter de Graeff
 (1707–1719) Cornelis de Graeff II.
 (1719–1752) Gerrit de Graeff I
 (1721-1721) Agneta de Graeff
 (1752–1766) Elisabeth Lestevenon
 (1766–1811) Gerrit de Graeff II.
 (1811–1814) Gerrit de Graeff (III.) van Zuid-Polsbroek
 (1814–1870) Gerrit de Graeff (IV.) van Zuid-Polsbroek

De Jong
 (1870–1912) Dirk de Jongh

See also
 Castle Purmerstein
 Castle Ilpenstein

Literature / External links
 Moelker, H.P., De heerlijkheid Purmerland en Ilpendam (1978 Purmerend) (nl)
 Bruijn, J.H. De, E.A. De bewoners van het Kasteel Ilpenstein en hun nakomelingen, 1827 - 1957. Ilpendam 1958 (nl)
 Groesbeek, J.W., Middeleeuwse kastelen van Noord-Holland. Hun bewoners en bewogen geschiedenis'' (1981 Rijswijk) page 276-283 (nl)
 Google -Booksearch: Het heerlijk veer van Ilpendam (nl)
 The Free and high Lordship of (Purmerend), Purmerland and Ilpendam at Heren van Holland (nl)
  G. van Enst Koning Het Huis te Ilpendam en deszelfs voornaamste Bezitters (nl)

Purmerend, Purmerland and Ilpendam, Free and high Lordship of
 
Purmerend, Purmerland and Ilpendam, Free and high Lordship of
Purmerend